1-Cyclohexylpiperazine is a derivative of piperazine, and a precursor for PB-28.

Piperazines
Cyclohexyl compounds